Sminthuridae is a family of springtails of the order Symphypleona. Sminthurids are commonly referred to as globular springtails.

Description 
Like other Symphypleona, Sminthuridae are globular in shape and have a furcula that allows them to jump. Members of this family have four-segmented antennae in which the basal segment is short and the rest successively increase in length. The terminal antennal segment has about 20 whorls of hairs and is divided into numerous subsegments. Sminthuridae also have well-developed tracheae. The dens has many setae, unlike in Mackenziellidae where it has 3 setae. Females have subanal appendages.

Ecology 
Sminthuridae occur in surface litter layers, on vegetation and in tropical forest canopies. They may be collected using Tullgren funnels or pitfall traps, or by sweeping through grass with a pan. Additionally, Sminthuridae is one of the springtail families that includes species living in freshwater.

List of genera 
Ten genera are placed within the Sminthuridae:
 Arrhopalites Borner, 1906
 Bourletiella Banks, 1899
 Collophora Richards, 1964
 Dicyrtoma Bourlet, 1842
 Neosminthurus Mills, 1934
 Ptenothrix Borner, 1906
 Sminthurides Borner, 1900
 Sminthurus Latreille, 1802
 Sphyrotheca Borner, 1906
 Vesicephalus Richards, 1964

Notable species 
 Allacma fusca, a common European species
 Sminthurus viridis, the lucerne flea, an introduced pest species in Australia

References 

Collembola
Arthropod families